Bolundra is a village, princely state and Taluka in Modasa, India. The village (Ta – Modasa) is in Aravalli district in Gujarat state, western India, on the bank of the River Meshvo.

Pin code: 383250

History 
The taluka was ranked a Sixth Class state, the lowest in the classification of the colonial Mahi Kantha Agency, and was ruled by Rajput chieftains. It covered six square miles, comprising five villages, and had a combined population in 1901 of 740, yielding a state revenue of 2,499 rupees (1903-4, mostly from land), paying a tribute of 134 rupees to Idar State.

References

External links

Princely states of Gujarat
Rajput princely states
Villages in Aravalli district